Morris and Company may refer to:

Morris & Company, a Chicago meatpacking company
Morris & Co., a decorative arts firm founded by William Morris